Epiperipatus edwardsii is a species of velvet worm in the Peripatidae family. Females of this species have 29 to 34 pairs of legs; males have 28 to 30. Females range from 23 mm to 56 mm in length, whereas males range from 25 mm to 30 mm. The type locality is in French Guiana.

References

Onychophorans of tropical America
Onychophoran species
Animals described in 1847